Michael Suter (born 1975) is a Swiss handball coach of the Swiss national team.

He coached the Swiss team at the 2020 European Men's Handball Championship.

References

1975 births
Living people
Handball coaches of international teams